The Paps of Anu ("the breasts of Anu") are a pair of breast-shaped mountains near Killarney in County Kerry, Ireland.

The mountains are named after Anu, believed to have been an ancient mother goddess. Cormac's Glossary describes Anu or Danu as "the mother of the gods of Ireland". On each summit is a prehistoric cairn, which may be miniature passage graves or house burial cists. They have been described as "stone nipples on the great breasts of the mother goddess". A line of stones, known as Na Fiacla, connects the two tops and is believed to have been a processional route. Archeologist Frank Coyne suggested that the mountains were seen as sacred and said "There is little doubt that the mountaintops of both The Paps…were utilized for ritual in prehistory". To the ancients, the mountains reinforced the idea that the Earth was a motherly body.

There is a stream running between the mountains. One half flows north into a small lake called Lough Nageeha and the other half flows south into the Clydagh River.

Cahercrovdarrig
To the northeast of the peaks is an ancient circular stone enclosure called Cahercrovdarrig (Cathair Crobh Dearg, 'Red Claw Fort/City') or 'The City'. The Paps can be clearly seen from Cahercrovdarrig and it appears that the two sites are linked. It contains a possible ruined megalithic tomb, an ogham stone, an earthen mound, a holy well and a cross-inscribed stone altar. When the water table is high enough, the water "noisily bubbles up from its depths".

It is believed that the site is named after the saint Crobh Dearg and was originally used for Beltane rituals and festivities. Over time, the site and the festivities became somewhat Christianized. A yearly May Day festival was held there up until World War II. According to local folklorist Dan Cronin, the festival involved music, dancing, drinking, and "champions…performing feats of valour". People would circle the well and the other features of the site while reciting prayers. They would also walk their cattle around the well as a purification ritual. In 1925 the festivities "were augmented…for the first time in modern memory, with the inclusion of a Mass". In his sermon, the priest commented that "The pagan danger is now past. Paganism is dead, or rather all the best elements in it have been absorbed into Christianity". After World War II, "all that remained of the event were the penitential rites, observed by the occasional visitor on any day of the year, and by a small crowd celebrating Mass there each May Day". A statue of Mary has been erected at the site. In 1983 a local affiliate of Comhaltas Ceoltóirí Éireann, the Irish cultural organization, working with the parish priest, reintroduced music and dance to the May Day festival at Cahercrovdarrig.

See also
 List of mountains in Ireland
 Maiden Paps

References

External links

Paps of Anu likely to be among world's 'sacred mountains'

Mountains and hills of County Kerry
Celtic mythology
Mountains under 1000 metres